Dutch flag-carrier airline KLM operates a fleet of 110 aircraft. The narrow-body fleet is composed of  Boeing 737 Next Generation aircraft which will be replaced by the Airbus A320neo family aircraft in the mid 2024. Airbus A330, Boeing 777 and Boeing 787 Dreamliner widebody aircraft are used primarily on long-haul flights.

Current fleet
, KLM (excluding its subsidiaries KLM Cityhopper, Transavia and Martinair) operates the following aircraft:

Gallery

Historical fleet

Over the years, KLM has operated the following aircraft types (list incomplete):

Fleet development

Fleet strategy

KLM's first of 8 Boeing 787-10 aircraft was delivered on 28 June 2019; it featured 100th anniversary markings.

On 19 June 2013, KLM had ordered 7 Airbus A350-900s. In June 2019, Air France–KLM announced that KLM will not take up any of the group's ordered A350s, because of fleet rationalization purposes.

CEO Ben Smith has announced at Air France's Investor Day (5 November 2019) in Paris that "in the near future" KLM will only use the 777 and 787 as their long-haul fleet, retiring their 13 A330s. This move would have made KLM an all-Boeing carrier, however KLM announced in December 2021 that an order was placed for 100 A320neo and A321neo aircraft, which is to be shared between it and Transavia. This order will replace KLM's short-haul Boeing 737 fleet, alongside Transavia's.

Special liveries
KLM has several aircraft painted in special liveries; they include:
 PH-BVA, a Boeing 777-300ER, features an orange forward fuselage that fades into the standard blue to commemorate the Netherlands national team's participation in the 2016 Summer Olympics in Rio de Janeiro.
 PH-KZU, a Fokker F70, has been applied with a special livery featuring Anthony Fokker, the founder of Fokker, commemorating the airline's long-standing history with Fokker aircraft and the phase-out of the Fokker 70 aircraft in October 2017.
 Several aircraft bear the silver SkyTeam alliance livery, including PH-BVD (a 777-300ER), PH-BXO (a 737-900), and PH-EZX (a KLM Cityhopper ERJ-190).
PH-BKA, a Boeing 787-10, features the standard KLM livery with a 100 wrapped around its lettering on the plane, this is because of the 100 years of being an established airline.

See also
 List of KLM destinations

References

Air France–KLM
Lists of aircraft by operator